Mecas linsleyi is a species of longhorn beetles found in North America. It was described by Knull in 1947.

References

Saperdini
Beetles described in 1947